Sudaraž is an uninhabited settlement in the region of Baranja, Croatia. Administratively, it is located in the Petlovac municipality within the Osijek-Baranja County.

History

Sudaraž has existed as part of the settlement from 1880. Its name was Sudaraš from 1880-1991. It was formally established as an independent settlement in 1991, when it was separated from the territory of Beli Manastir.

Population

References

Literature

 Book: "Narodnosni i vjerski sastav stanovništva Hrvatske, 1880-1991: po naseljima, author: Jakov Gelo, izdavač: Državni zavod za statistiku Republike Hrvatske, 1998., ;

Former populated places in Croatia
Baranya (region)
Osijek-Baranja County